The UK Singles Chart is one of many music charts compiled by the Official Charts Company that calculates the best-selling singles of the week in the United Kingdom. Before 2004, the chart was only based on the sales of physical singles. This list shows singles that peaked in the Top 10 of the UK Singles Chart during 1980, as well as singles which peaked in 1979 and 1981 but were in the top 10 in 1980. The entry date is when the single appeared in the top 10 for the first time (week ending, as published by the Official Charts Company, which is six days after the chart is announced).

One-hundred and forty-seven singles were in the top ten in 1980. Ten singles from 1979 remained in the top 10 for several weeks at the beginning of the year, while "Antmusic" by Adam and the Ants, "Imagine" by John Lennon and "Happy Xmas (War is Over)" by John Lennon, Yoko Ono, the Plastic Ono Band with the Harlem Community Center Choir were all released in 1980 but did not reach their peak until 1981. "Day Trip to Bangor (Didn't We Have a Lovely Time)" by Fiddler's Dram, "Wonderful Christmastime" by Paul McCartney and "Brass in Pocket" by The Pretenders were the singles from 1979 to reach their peak in 1980. Twenty-eight artists scored multiple entries in the top 10 in 1980. Adam and the Ants, Dexys Midnight Runners, Sheena Easton, Spandau Ballet and UB40 were among the many artists who achieved their first UK charting top 10 single in 1980.

The 1979 Christmas number-one, "Another Brick in the Wall" by Pink Floyd, remained at number-one for the first two weeks of 1980. The first new number-one single of the year was "Brass in Pocket" by The Pretenders. Overall, twenty-five different singles peaked at number-one in 1980, with Blondie, The Jam and ABBA (2) having the joint most singles hit that position.

Background

Multiple entries
One-hundred and forty-seven singles charted in the top 10 in 1980, with one-hundred and thirty-seven singles reaching their peak this year.

Twenty-eight artists scored multiple entries in the top 10 in 1980. Madness and The Police shared the record for most top 10 hits in 1980 with four hit singles each. Seven artists recorded three singles which reached the top 10 this year: ABBA, The Beat, Blondie, John Lennon, Paul McCartney, The Specials and UB40.

David Bowie was one of a number of artists with two top 10 entries, including the number-one single "Ashes to Ashes". Adam and the Ants, Cliff Richard, The Jam, Michael Jackson and Roxy Music were among the other artists who had multiple top 10 entries in 1980.

Chart debuts
Fifty-six artists achieved their first top 10 single in 1980, either as a lead or featured artist. Of these, six went on to record another hit single that year: Adam and the Ants, Dexys Midnight Runners, George Benson, Liquid Gold, The Nolans and Sheena Easton. The Beat and UB40 both had two other entries in their breakthrough year.

The following table (collapsed on desktop site) does not include acts who had previously charted as part of a group and secured their first top 10 solo single.

Notes
Peter Gabriel made his first top 10 appearance this year since his departure from Genesis. His debut solo single "Solsbury Hill" missed the top 10 in 1979, but he took "Games Without Frontiers" to number 4.

Jermaine Jackson achieved six previous top 10 hits as part of the Jackson 5, but "Let's Get Serious" was his first top 10 appearance as a solo artist.

Actor Mike Berry scored a top 10 hit - "Don't You Think It's Time" (6) - with his backing group The Outlaws in 1963. "The Sunshine of Your Smile" was his first and only independent top 10 hit.

Songs from films
Original songs from various films entered the top 10 throughout the year. These included "With You I'm Born Again" (from Fast Break), "Call Me" (American Gigolo), "Theme from M*A*S*H* (Suicide Is Painless)" (MASH) and "Xanadu" (Xanadu).

Best-selling singles
The Police had the best-selling single of the year with "Don't Stand So Close to Me". The single spent six weeks in the top 10 (including four weeks at number one) and was certified gold by the BPI. "Woman in Love" by Barbra Streisand came in second place. Kelly Marie's "Feels Like I'm in Love", "Super Trouper" from ABBA and "D.I.S.C.O." by Ottawan made up the top five. Singles by Blondie, Dexys Midnight Runners, Fern Kinney, Kenny Rogers and The Detroit Spinners were also in the top ten best-selling singles of the year.

Top-ten singles
Key

Entries by artist

The following table shows artists who achieved two or more top 10 entries in 1980, including singles that reached their peak in 1979 or 1981. The figures include both main artists and featured artists, while appearances on ensemble charity records are also counted for each artist. The total number of weeks an artist spent in the top ten in 1980 is also shown.

Notes

 "Antmusic" reached its peak of number two on 17 January 1981 (week ending).
 "Take That Look Off Your Face" was written for the Andrew Lloyd Webber musical Tell Me On a Sunday.
 "What's Another Year" was Ireland's winning entry at the Eurovision Song Contest in 1980.
 "It's Only Love" was originally released on its own without its double A-side "Beyond the Reef" in 1971 and charted in the US but not in the UK.
 "I Could Be So Good for You" was the theme song to the television series Minder.
 "(Just Like) Starting Over" re-entered the top 10 at number-one on 20 December 1980 (week ending), one week after John Lennon's murder.
 "Happy Xmas (War is Over)" was first released as a single in the UK in 1972 and made the top 10, peaking at number 4. It re-entered the top 10 following John Lennon's death in December 1980, reaching its new peak of number 2 in January 1981.
 "Imagine" was first released as a single in the UK in 1975 and made the top 10, peaking at number 6. It re-entered the top 10 following John Lennon's death in December 1980, reaching its new peak of number-one in January 1981.
 Figure includes single that peaked in 1979.
 Figure includes single that peaked in 1981.
 Figure includes single that first charted in 1979 but peaked in 1980.

See also
1980 in British music
List of number-one singles from the 1980s (UK)

References
General

Specific

External links
1980 singles chart archive at the Official Charts Company (click on relevant week)
The Official Top 50 best-selling songs of 1980 at the Official Charts Company

United Kingdom
Top 10 singles
1980